Ashenden is a BBC1 four part TV series based on the 1927 spy novel, Ashenden: Or the British Agent, by W. Somerset Maugham, that aired from 17 November to 8 December 1991, directed by Christopher Morahan, with Alex Jennings in the title role, Joss Ackland as Cumming, Ian Bannen as 'R' and Jason Isaacs as Andrew Lehman. Guest actors included Harriet Walter as Giulia Lazzari in the first episode, Alan Bennett as Grantly Caypor in the second, René Auberjonois as John Quincy Harrington in the third, with Elizabeth McGovern as Aileen Sommerville and Alfred Molina as Carmona, the titular character, in the final story. A framing device at the start of each episode shows progressively more of an aged Ashenden living in France in the mid-1960s, reacting adversely to a piece of music on the radio. The final episode – which gives the context to this section – closes with a return to this "future" setting.

Cast
 Alex Jennings as John Ashenden
 Joss Ackland as Cumming
 Ian Bannen as 'R'
 Jason Isaacs as Andrew Lehman
 Sarah Bullen as 'R's secretary
 Fiona Mollison as Sarah
 Jane Hollowood as Maid
 Peter Stockbridge as Roberts
 Harriet Walter as Giulia Lazzari
 Alan Bennett as Grantly Caypor
 René Auberjonois as John Quincy Harrington
 Elizabeth McGovern as Aileen Sommerville
 Alfred Molina as Carmona

Episodes
The Dark Woman (17 November 1991)
The Traitor (24 November 1991)
Mr Harrington's Washing (1 December 1991)
The Hairless Mexican (8 December 1991)

External links
 

1991 British television series debuts
1991 British television series endings
1990s British drama television series
BBC television dramas
Espionage television series
Television shows set in France
Television shows based on British novels
English-language television shows
1990s British television miniseries